Uthman ibn Sa'id al-Asadi al-Amri was the first of the Four Deputies, who are believed by the Twelvers to have successively represented their twelfth Imam, Muhammad al-Mahdi, during his Minor Occultation (874–941 CE). Uthman is also said to have been a trusted representative of the tenth and eleventh Imams, Ali al-Hadi and Hasan al-Askari, respectively. The date of his death is not certain, though it is believed that Uthman did not survive al-Askari for long.

Historical background 
Until their deaths, the tenth and eleventh Shia Imams (Ali al-Hadi and Hasan al-Askari, respectively) were held under close surveillance in the garrison town of Samarra by the Abbasids, who are often responsible in Shia sources for poisoning the two Imams. The two Imams witnessed the deterioration of the Abbasid caliphate, as the imperial authority rapidly transitioned into the hands of the Turks, particularly after al-Mutawakkil.

Contemporary to the tenth Imam, the Abbasid al-Mutawakkil violently prosecuted the Shia, partly due to the renewed Zaydi opposition. The restrictive policies of al-Mutawakkil towards the tenth Imam were later adopted by his son, al-Mu'tamid, who is reported to have kept the eleventh Imam under house arrest without any visitors. Instead, al-Askari is known to have mainly communicated with his followers through a network of representatives. Among them was Uthman ibn Sa'id, who is said to have disguised himself as a seller of cooking fat to avoid the Abbasid agents, hence his nickname al-Samman. Tabatabai suggests that these restrictions were placed on al-Askari because the caliphate had come to know about traditions among the Shia elite, predicting that the eleventh Imam would father the eschatological Mahdi.

Underground network 
The underground network of representatives might date back to Ja'far al-Sadiq, the sixth Imam, in response to the Abbasid restrictions on him. The Abbasid al-Rashid is said to have carried out a campaign of arrests in 179 (795) to decimate this underground network which ultimately led to the arrest of Musa al-Kazim, the seventh Imam, and his death in prison.

By the time of Muhammad al-Jawad, the ninth Imam, some of the representatives took administrative and military roles in the caliphate by practicing religious dissimulation. The underground network of Ali al-Hadi, the tenth Imam, was highly developed, especially in Samarra, Baghdad, Mada'in, and Sawad. However, a campaign of arrests and the subsequent tortures by the Abbasid al-Mutawakkil might have led the caliph to discover that the Imam was behind their activities. Al-Mutawakkil then summoned the Imam to Samarra, where he was kept under close surveillance and possibly house arrest. According to Hussain, restrictions on the later Imams inevitably expanded the role and authority of their representatives, particularly their main agent. By performing certain functions of the Imams, these representatives might have hoped to save the Imams from the political pressure of the Abbasids.

Tenure as an agent of al-Hadi
Uthman was a close associate of the tenth Imam, Ali al-Hadi. It is reported that he was eleven when he first served as an agent for this Imam.

Tenure as an agent of al-Askari 
After the death of al-Hadi in 254 (868), his successor, Hasan al-Askari, appointed Uthman as a representative in 256 (869-70). It also seems certain that Uthman became the closest associate of the eleventh Imam. Both al-Hadi and al-Askari are said to have praised Uthman as highly trustworthy. As a representative of the two Imams, Uthman disguised himself as a seller of cooking fat to avoid the Abbasid agents, hence his nickname al-Samman. It is reported that he collected religious donations, hid them in the containers of cooking fat, and delivered them to al-Askari. After the death of al-Askari in 260 (874), Uthman performed the funeral rites of the eleventh Imam, an honor for which he must have received the permission of al-Askari beforehand.

Tenure as an agent of al-Mahdi
Immediately after the death of al-Askari in 260 (874), Uthman claimed that the eleventh Imam had a young son, named Muhammad, who had entered a state of occultation due to the Abbasid threat to his life. As the special agent of al-Askari, Uthman also claimed that he had been appointed to represent the son of the eleventh Imam. Twelver sources detail that Muhammad al-Mahdi made his only public appearance to lead the funeral prayer for his father instead of his uncle, Ja'far. 

As the closest associate of al-Askari, the local representatives and the Shia community largely recognized Uthman's claim to be the agent of the Hidden Imam. However, there were possibly doubts among the Shia about Uthman's authority to collect and distribute the religious donations. In his new capacity as the caretaker of the office of imamate, Uthman also received petitions and made available their responses, sometimes in writing.  

The date of his death is not certain, but it is believed that Uthman did not survive al-Askari for long. Klemm holds that Uthman died in 880 CE. Uthman was succeeded by his son, Abu Ja'far Muhammad, as the next agent of the Hidden Imam. Tusi in his Rijal reports that the eleventh Imam had appointed Uthman and his son as agents of his son, Muhammad, in the presence of a group of Yemeni followers.

See also
Abu Ja'far Muhammad ibn Uthman
Abu al-Qasim al-Husayn ibn Ruh al-Nawbakhti
Abu al-Hasan Ali ibn Muhammad al-Samarri

References

Sources

 
 
 
 
 
 
 
 
 
 
 
 
 
 

Iraqi Shia Muslims
Mahdism